Saint Vincent and the Grenadines–Turkey relations are foreign relations between Saint Vincent and the Grenadines and Turkey.

The Turkish ambassador in Port of Spain is also accredited to St. Vincent and the Grenadines.

Diplomatic relations 

Bilateral relations between two countries have been warm and friendly. St. Vincent and the Grenadines’s foreign policy traditionally mirrored that of Britain’s. The two countries ties were especially close after Maurice Bishop’s New Jewel Movement coming to power in 1979, when the public opinion in St. Vincent and the Grenadines supported Prime Minister Cato’s decision to intervene in Grenada.

High level visits

Economic relations 
 Trade volume between the two countries was US$11.3 million in 2018 (Turkish exports/imports: 4.8/6.5 million USD).

See also 

 Foreign relations of Saint Vincent and the Grenadines
 Foreign relations of Turkey

References

Further reading 

 "Saint Vincent and the Grenadines." pp. 2337–42 in The Europa Yearbook 1987, II. London: Europa, 1987.
 Kingston, Jamaica: Longmans Caribbean, 1971. Marshall, Woodville K. "Vox Populi: The St. Vincent Riots and Disturbances of 1862." pp. 85–116 in Barry W. Higman (ed.),Trade, Government, and Society in Caribbean History, 1 700–1920. Kingston, Jamaica: Heinemann, 1983.
 Laine, Kingsley. "An Overview of the Vincentian Economy," Bulletin of Eastern Caribbean Affairs [Cave Hill, Barbados], November–December 1979, p. 13.
 World Bank. St. Vincent and the Grenadines: Economic Situation and Selected Development Issues. Washington: 1985.

 
Turkey
Bilateral relations of Turkey